Les villages détruits (the destroyed villages) are in northern France, mostly in the French département of Meuse. During the First World War, specifically at the time of the Battle of Verdun in 1916, many villages in northern France were destroyed by the fighting. After the war, it was decided that the land previously occupied by the destroyed villages would not be incorporated into other communes, as a testament to these villages which had "died for France", as they were declared, and to preserve their memory.

While three of the villages in Meuse were subsequently rebuilt and are governed as normal communes, the other six are entirely unpopulated and are managed by a council of three members, appointed by the prefect of Meuse. All of these communes are located in the Canton of Belleville-sur-Meuse (in the Canton of Charny-sur-Meuse before cantonal reorganization in 2015) in the Arrondissement of Verdun, and are generally located north of the city of Verdun, in the Lorraine region of northeastern France.

List of villages (communes)

In Meuse
 Beaumont-en-Verdunois
 Bezonvaux
 Cumières-le-Mort-Homme
 Douaumont (partially reconstructed)
 Fleury-devant-Douaumont, location of the Verdun Memorial
 Haumont-près-Samogneux
 Louvemont-Côte-du-Poivre
 Ornes (partially reconstructed)
 Vaux-devant-Damloup (rebuilt)

In Marne

Auve
Beauséjour, Marne
Bignicourt-sur-Saultz (3/33 homes remained) 30 men and 45 women and children were taken captive.
Étrepy (7/70 homes remained)
Glannes
Hurlus
Le Mesnil-lès-Hurlus 
Perthes-lès-Hurlus 
Ripont 
Somme-Tourbe (everything in the village except the village hall (Mairie), church, and two private buildings)
Tahure 
Moronvilliers
Nauroy
Sermaize-les-Bains (40/900 homes remained). About 150 people from the village were taken captive.
Suippes

In Meurthe-et-Moselle
Regniéville
Remenauville 
Fey-en-Haye 
Flirey

In Aisne
Moussy-sur-Aisne
Vauclerc-et-la-Vallée-Foulon
Ailles
Beaulne-et-Chivy
Courtecon
Craonne

See also
 Mort pour la France
 No man's land, the area between the lines during the First World War
 Oradour-sur-Glane, a village in Limousin destroyed in the Second World War and later rebuilt nearby.
 Pozières (located in the Département of Somme)
 Zone rouge (First World War)

References

External links

 Website commemorating the destroyed villages (in French)
 French Wikipedia article

Villages in France
Geography of Meuse (department)

Destroyed cities
France in World War I
1916 in France
Military history of Lorraine
Former villages